Zhu Guangsheng (born January 1963) is a Chinese engineer currently working as a researcher at China Aerospace Science and Technology Corporation and architect at China Academy of Launch Vehicle Technology.

Biography
Zhu was born in January 1963. After graduating from National University of Defense Technology in 1989, he was assigned to the 14th Institute of the 1st Academy of China Aerospace Science and Technology Corporation

Honours and awards
 November 22, 2019 Member of the Chinese Academy of Engineering (CAE)

References

1963 births
Living people
National University of Defense Technology alumni
Members of the Chinese Academy of Engineering